Jen-Hsun "Jensen" Huang (born February 17, 1963) is a Taiwanese American billionaire business magnate, electrical engineer, and the co-founder, current president and CEO of Nvidia Corporation.

Early years and education 
Huang was born in Tainan, Taiwan. His family emigrated to the United States when he was 9 years old, first living in Oneida, Kentucky, and settling in Oregon, where he graduated from Aloha High School just outside Portland.

Huang received his undergraduate degree in electrical engineering from Oregon State University in 1984, and his master's degree in electrical engineering from Stanford University in 1992.

Career 
After college he was a director at LSI Logic and a microprocessor designer at Advanced Micro Devices, Inc. (AMD). On his 30th birthday in 1993, Huang co-founded Nvidia and is the CEO and president.

He owns 3.6% of Nvidia's stock, which went public in 1999.

He earned $24.6 million as CEO in 2007, ranking him as the 61st highest paid U.S. CEO by Forbes.

As of January 2023, Huang's net worth is  according to the Bloomberg Billionaires Index.

Philanthropy 

In 2022 Huang donated $50 million to his alma mater, Oregon State University, as a portion of a $200 million donation towards the creation of super computing institute on campus.

Huang gave his other alma mater Stanford University US$30 million to build the Jen-Hsun Huang School of Engineering Center. The building is the second of four that make up Stanford's Science and Engineering Quad. It was designed by Bora Architects of Portland, Oregon and completed in 2010. Huang gave his alma mater Oneida Baptist Institute $2 million to build Huang Hall, a new girls' dormitory and classroom building. It was designed by CMW Architects of Lexington, Kentucky.

In 2007, Huang was the recipient of the Silicon Valley Education Foundation's Pioneer Business Leader Award for his work in both the corporate and philanthropic worlds.

Awards 

In 1999, Jensen Huang was named Entrepreneur of the Year in High Technology by Ernst & Young. In 2003, Huang received the Dr. Morris Chang Exemplary Leadership Award, which recognizes a leader who has made exceptional contributions to driving the development, innovation, growth, and long-term opportunities of the fabless semiconductor industry, from the Fabless Semiconductor Association. He was also a National Finalist for the EY Entrepreneur of the Year Award in 2003 and was an Award Recipient for the Northern California region in 1999.

Additionally, Huang is a recipient of the Daniel J. Epstein Engineering Management Award from the University of Southern California and was named an Alumni Fellow by Oregon State University. Huang was awarded an honorary doctorate from Oregon State University at the June 13, 2009, commencement ceremony.

In 2018, Huang was listed in the inaugural Edge 50, naming the world's top 50 influencers in edge computing. In October 2019, Harvard Business Review named Jensen Huang best-performing CEO in the world. In November 2020, Jensen Huang was named "Supplier CEO of the year" by Eurostars AutomotiveNewsEurope. Huang was awarded an honorary doctorate from National Taiwan University at the school anniversary in November, 2020. In August 2021, the Semiconductor Industry Association (SIA) announced that Jensen Huang is the 2021 recipient of the industry’s highest honor, the Robert N. Noyce Award. In September 2021, he was included in the Time 100, Times annual list of the 100 most influential people in the world.

Personal life 
While at Oregon State, Huang met his future wife, Lori, his engineering lab partner at the time. Huang has two children.

See also 
 Huang's law

References

External links 

 "An Interview with Jen Hsun Huang". Wired July 2002. Volume 10, Number 7
 Nvidia Corporate Biography
 

1963 births
AMD people
American billionaires
American people of Taiwanese descent
American computer businesspeople
American electrical engineers
American technology chief executives
American technology company founders
Businesspeople from Taipei
Engineers from Oregon
Living people
Members of Committee of 100
Nvidia people
Oneida Baptist Institute alumni
Oregon State University alumni
People from Aloha, Oregon
Stanford University alumni
Taiwanese emigrants to the United States